For the results of the Bolivia national football team, see:
 Bolivia national football team results (1926–1979)
 Bolivia national football team results (1980–1999)
 Bolivia national football team results (2000–2019)
 Bolivia national football team results (2020–present)